The Entire City is the debut studio album by English electronic music project Gazelle Twin of composer, producer and musician Elizabeth Bernholz. It was released on 11 July 2011 by Anti-Ghost Moon Ray Records.

Background
The album was the first one that Bernholz produced. She used Ableton 7 to create it. The artist describes The Entire City as her "landscape album". She further explains that she was "illustrating places and times and alien landscapes, but warped memories too".

Critical reception

The Entire City garnered critical acclaim upon release. Charlotte Richardson Andrews of The Guardian gave the album a five-star review, calling it a "stunning debut". Simon Price wrote the record "will haunt you long after listening", in his review for The Independent on Sunday. Jazz Monroe, writing for Drowned in Sound, gave it an eight out of ten, opining that "The Entire City - while slippery as a fish out of water, by all accounts - is crystal clear of ambition and concept." He also did another review for NME, giving it a similar score and calling it a "triumph of art-pop splendour – equal parts terror and temerity."

Track listing

Personnel
Credits adapted from the liner notes of The Entire City.

 Gazelle Twin – composition, recording, production, lyrics
 Shawn Joseph – mastering 
 Russ Keffert – mastering 
 Suzanne Moxhay – artwork

References

2011 debut albums
Gazelle Twin albums